Joseph Bradford (174828 May 1808) was a British preacher and travelling companion of John Wesley.

Life
Bradford was John Wesley's travelling companion 1774–1780 and again 1787–1790. Wesley entrusted Bradford with transcribing his Journal and in 1785 also entrusted him with a letter to be read to the Conference after Wesley's death.
When Wesley was on his deathbed his friend Joseph Bradford was at his side.

Bradford was twice President of the Methodist Conference in 1795 and 1803. Bradford served as the first governor of Kingswood School from 1795 to 1802.

Bradford suffered a severe paralysing stroke some months before his death in 1808.

References

Notes

Citations

Sources

Further reading

External links

1740s births
1808 deaths
Presidents of the Methodist Conference
Year of birth uncertain